San Luis al Medio is a village in the Rocha Department of southeastern Uruguay.

Geography

History
On 3 November 1952, its status was elevated to "Pueblo" (village) by the Act of Ley Nº 11.876.

Population
In 2011 San Luis al Medio had a population of 598.
 
Source: Instituto Nacional de Estadística de Uruguay

Notable people 
 Alem García, politician, President of the Chamber of Deputies in 1992.

References

External links
INE map of San Luis al Medio

Populated places in the Rocha Department